Robert Charles Hider (born 1943, London) is a Professor of Medicinal Chemistry at King's College London. He is a specialist in therapeutic iron chelators.

Education
After education at Winslade School, Exeter, Hider attended King's College London as a BSc chemistry and physics undergraduate (1961–64), and then obtained a Ph.D. there in synthetic chemistry (1967).

Academic career 
Holder began a career in biological chemistry in the endocrinology department of St Thomas's Hospital Medical School under the supervision of David London. He studied the influence of insulin on muscle protein synthesis. In 1970 he was appointed as the first lecturer in biological chemistry at Essex University and initiated the biological chemistry degree. During this period his research was directed towards the study of membranes, the mechanisms of penetration of such structures and their mode of interaction with animal toxins. > In 1977 he was awarded sabbatical leave and worked with Joe Neilands, in the Department of Biochemistry, the University of California, Berkeley. This laboratory was centred on siderophore chemistry and biochemistry 

On return to the UK, Hider  in collaboration with Ernest Huehns, developed the first orally active iron chelator, deferiprone,  which was introduced into clinical trials by Victor Hoffbrand in 1987. During this decade he was promoted to senior lecturer and then to reader. Deferiprone is currently used worldwide for the treatment of transfusion – induced iron overload, which is associated with β-thalassaemia and sickle cell anaemia.

In 1987 Hider was appointed professor of medicinal chemistry in the pharmacy department of King's College London, where he continued his studies on iron biochemistry. Over the period 1987–2008 he introduced several analytical methods for "non-transferrin bound iron" and continued to develop new iron chelators and particularly those targeted to mitochondria. He collaborated with Ciba Geigy (now Novartis), Apotex, Shire Pharmaceuticals, Vifor, and Renapharma.

During the 1992–2008 period at King’s College Hider was, at various times, head of the health science division (1992–1994), head of the School of Life, Basic Medicinal and Health Sciences (1994–2000); head of the department of pharmacy (2000–2003), and head of the School of Biomedical and Health Sciences (2003–2007). In 2008, he retired from teaching and administration duties but continued to maintain an active research laboratory.

Selected publications 
His most cited articles are:

Hider RC, Kong X. Chemistry and biology of siderophores. Natural product reports. 2010;27(5):637-57 
 Shayeghi M, Latunde-Dada GO, Oakhill JS, Laftah AH, Takeuchi K, Halliday N, Khan Y, Warley A, McCann FE, Hider RC, Frazer DM. Identification of an intestinal heme transporter. Cell. 2005 Sep 9;122(5):789-801. 
Hider RC. Siderophore mediated absorption of iron. InSiderophores from Microorganisms and Plants 1984 (pp. 25-87). Springer, Berlin, Heidelberg.

Honours 
Fellow of the Royal Society of Chemistry, 1987
Science chairman of the Royal Pharmaceutical Society of Great Britain, 1998
Fellow of King's College London, 1999
Academic lead of department of trade and industry delegation visiting China, 2000
Hanbury Memorial Medal, 2014;from the Royal Pharmaceutical Society
Honorary professor at Zhejiang University, Hangzhou, China, 2015–present
Paul Erlich Award, 2017; from the International Bio-Iron Society
Honorary professor at the University of Bath, UK, 2019–present

Personal life 

Hider married Shirley Nickels in 1967.  They have two children and six grandchildren.

References

External links 
 

Fellows of the Royal Society of Chemistry
Fellows of King's College London
1943 births
Living people